Najeeb Amar (born 25 September 1971) is a Pakistani-born Hong Kong cricketer.

Najeeb made his One Day International debut for Hong Kong in the 2004 Asia Cup in Sri Lanka.  As of May 2005 he has played two One Day Internationals for Hong Kong, both in the Asia Cup and is unlikely to add to this total during his playing career.

Najeeb is a left-arm orthodox spin bowler and lower-order left-handed batsman.  He had previously represented the Water and Power Development Authority in the Pakistan local one-day competition.

External links and references 

HowSTAT! statistical profile of Najeeb Amar

1971 births
Living people
Hong Kong cricketers
Hong Kong One Day International cricketers
Hong Kong Twenty20 International cricketers
Water and Power Development Authority cricketers
Hong Kong people of Pakistani descent
Hong Kong cricket captains
People from Dera Ghazi Khan District
Pakistani cricketers
Cricketers at the 2010 Asian Games
Pakistani emigrants to Hong Kong